Nymphicula edwardsi is a moth in the family Crambidae. It was described by David John Lawrence Agassiz in 2014. It is found in Australia, where it has been recorded from Queensland.

The wingspan is about 14 mm. The base of the forewing is dark brown and there is a white antemedian band. The medial zone is white, covered with brown scales. The base of the hindwings is tinged greyish brown and there is a white subbasal band, as well as brown antemedian band with an orange spot. The medial zone is white, scaled with dark brown.

Etymology
The species is named in honour of Ted Edwards, a lepidopterist at the Australian National Insect Collection.

References

Nymphicula
Moths described in 2014